Nikola Stanković may refer to:
 Nikola Stanković (footballer, born 1993)
 Nikola Stanković (footballer, born 2003)